Justin Pearson (born 1971) is a British stunt man and stunt coordinator who is best known for his stunt work in Harry Potter and the Deathly Hallows – Part 2 (2011), Skyfall (2012), and Wonder Woman (2017) for which he received Screen Actors Guild Awards in 2012, 2013 and 2017 respectively, as part of a stunt ensemble.

In addition to Justin's role within the film and television stunt industry, he runs a jousting display team,The Knights of the Damned Jousting Stunt Team.

Biography

Having been born into an equestrian family, Justin was involved from a young age with horses. In particular showjumping and mounted games were passions that he took part in, the latter being a discipline in which he represented his country 8 times. Additionally, he was named the Mounted Games Association of Great Britain Champion in 1995 and World Champion Reserve in 2004.

When Justin was 18 years old he toured the world with a professional medieval jousting team which saw him perform in many locations across the globe including St Petersburg, before training to become a stuntman and being accepted onto the British Stunt Register.

Books 
In December 2021, Justin pearson authored a book entitled 'Rolling with the Punches' documenting his life as a professional stuntman and stunt coordinator.

Stunt credits

Films

 2018 Jungle Book (stunt performer)
 2017 Wonder Woman (stunt performer)
 2016 Doctor Strange (stunt performer)
 2016 The Girl with All the Gifts (stunt performer)
 2016 Tulip Fever (stunt performer)
 2016 The Legend of Tarzan (stunt performer)
 2016 The Hitman's Bodyguard (stunt performer)
 2016 Now You See Me 2 (stunt performer)
 2016 Criminal (stunt double: Kevin Costner) / (stunt performer) 
 2016 London Has Fallen (stunt performer: UK)
 2015 Spectre (stunt double: Rory Kinnear) / (stunt performer) 
 2015 Legend (stunt performer) 
 2015 The Bad Education Movie (stunt performer) 
 2015 The Man from U.N.C.L.E. (stunt performer) 
 2015 Macbeth (stunt performer) 
 2015 Avengers: Age of Ultron (stunt performer) 
 2015 Predator Dark Ages (Short) (horsemaster) / (stunt coordinator) / (stunt performer)  
 2014 The Woman in Black 2: Angel of Death (stunt double) / (stunt double: Jeremy Irvine) 
 2014 Into the Woods (stunt double: The Baker) / (stunt performer) 
 2014 Hercules (stunt performer)
 2014 Maleficent (stunt performer) 
 2014 Vampire Academy (stunt performer) 
 2014 Jack Ryan: Shadow Recruit (stunt performer) 
 2013 One Chance (stunt performer) 
 2013 RED 2 (stunt performer) 
 2013 Fast & Furious 6 (stunts)
 2012 Skyfall (stunts) 
 2012 Wrath of the Titans (stunt double: Sam Worthington) / (stunt performer)  
 2011 W.E. (stuntman) 
 2011 Harry Potter and the Deathly Hallows: Part 2 (stunt performer) 
 2011 Pirates of the Caribbean: On Stranger Tides (stunt double) / (stunt double: Captain of the Guard) / (stunt performer) 
 2011 Your Highness (stunt double: Danny McBride) / (stunts) 
 2010 Harry Potter and the Deathly Hallows: Part 1 (stunt performer) 
 2010 Freight (stunt double) / (stunt performer) 
 2010 Tamara Drewe (stunt double) 
 2010 Kick-Ass (stunt performer) 
 2010 The Wolfman (stunt performer) 
 2008 Mamma Mia! (stunt performer)  
 2008 Placebo (stunt double) 
 2007 Boy A (stunt performer) 
 2007 28 Weeks Later (stunt performer) 
 2007 Sunshine (stunt double) 
 2006 Penelope (stunt performer) 
 2002 The Four Feathers (stunts) 
 2002 Reign of Fire (stunts)

Television

 2016 Henry VIII and His Six Wives (TV Mini-Series) (stunt coordinator - 1 episode) 
 2016 The Aliens (TV Series) (stunt performer - 1 episode) 
 Dickensian (TV Series) (stunt double - 1 episode, 2016) (stunt performer and stunt double - 1 episode, 2016) 
 2015-2016 Mr Selfridge (TV Series) (stunt performer - 2 episodes) 
 2016 Stan Lee's Lucky Man (TV Series) (stunt performer - 2016) 
 2016 Shetland (TV Series) (stunt double - 1 episode) 
 2016 The Secret Agent (TV Series) (stunt coordinator - 1 episode)
 2015 Legends (TV Series) (stunt double - 1 episode) 
 2015 And Then There Were None (TV Mini-Series) (stunt coordinator - 1 episode) 
 2015 Jekyll & Hyde (TV Series) (stunts - 1 episode) 
 2015 The Bastard Executioner (TV Series) (stunt performer - 7 episodes) 
 Da Vinci's Demons (TV Series) (stunt double - 1 episode, 2015) (stunt performer - 1 episode, 2015) 
 2015 Safe House (TV Series) (stunt double - 1 episode) 
 2015 Stella (TV Series) (stunt performer - 1 episode) 
 Father Brown (TV Series) (stunt double - 1 episode, 2015) (stunt performer - 1 episode, 2015) 
 2015 Hollyoaks (TV Series) (stunt double - 1 episode) 
 2014 Peaky Blinders (TV Series) (stunt performer - 3 episodes) 
 2014 The Great Fire (TV Mini-Series) (stunt performer - 1 episode) 
 2014 Keep It in the Family (TV Series) (stunt performer - 2014) 
 2014 Glue (TV Mini-Series) (stunts - 2014) 
 2014 24: Live Another Day (TV Mini-Series) (stunt performer - 4 episodes) 
 2011-2014 Game of Thrones (TV Series) (stunt performer - 3 episodes) 
 Jamaica Inn (TV Mini-Series) (stunt performer - 2 episodes, 2014) (stunt double - 1 episode, 2014) 
 2013 Atlantis (TV Series) (stunt performer - 2 episodes) 
 2013 The Guilty (TV Mini-Series) (stunt performer - 2013) 
 2013 Silent Witness (TV Series) (stunt double - 1 episode) 
 2012 Casualty (TV Series) (stunt performer - 1 episode) 
 2011 Merlin (TV Series) (stunt performer - 4 episodes) 
 2010 Upstairs Downstairs (TV Series) (stunt performer - 1 episode) 
 2010 Accused (TV Series) (stunt performer - 1 episode) 
 2010 MI-5 (TV Series) (stunt performer - 1 episode) 
 2010 Identity (TV Series) (stunts - 1 episode) 
 2009 We Are Klang (TV Series) (stunt performer - 1 episode) 
 2009 Minder (TV Series) (stunt performer - 1 episode) 
 2008 Crusoe (TV Series) (stunts - 1 episode) 
 2008 The Wall (TV Series) (stunt performer - 2008, 2010)  
 Holby City (TV Series) (stunt performer - 1 episode, 2007) (stunt double - 1 episode, 2007)
 2007 The Bill (TV Series) (stunt double - 3 episodes) 
 2007 Midsomer Murders (TV Series) (stunt double - 1 episode) 
 2006 The Line of Beauty (TV Mini-Series) (stunt double - 2 episodes) 
 2005 The National Lottery: Come & Have a Go (TV Series) (stunt performer - 2005) 
 2001 The Hunt (TV Movie) (stunt double: Philip Glenister) / (stunts) 
 2000 Lorna Doone (TV Movie) (stunt performer) 
 2000 Waking the Dead (TV Series) (stunt double)

References

1971 births
Living people